Dear Lonely Hearts is a 1962 studio album by Nat King Cole, arranged by Belford Hendricks.  The title track went to #2 for two weeks on the Easy Listening charts and #13 on the Hot 100. The LP peaked at #24 on the Billboard album chart.

Track listing
 "Dear Lonely Hearts" (Bob Halley, E.J. Anton) – 3:08
 "Miss You" (Charles Tobias, Harry Tobias) – 2:32
 "Why Should I Cry Over You?" (Chester Conn, Nathan "Ned" Miller) – 2:26
 "Near You" (Francis Craig, Kermit Goell) – 2:16
 "Yearning (Just for You)" (Benny Davis, Joe Burke) – 2:30
 "My First and Only Lover" (Artie Kaplan, Paul Kaufman, Jack Keller) – 2:25
 "All Over the World" (Al Frisch, C. Tobias) – 2:25
 "Oh, How I Miss You Tonight" (Davis, Joe Burke, Mark Fisher) – 2:24
 "Lonesome and Sorry" (Con Conrad, Davis) – 2:23
 "All by Myself" (Irving Berlin) – 2:15
 "Who's Next in Line?" (Clyde Otis, Rose Marie McCoy) – 2:21
 "It's a Lonesome Old Town" (Charles Kisco, C. Tobias) – 2:03

Personnel

Performance
 Nat King Cole – vocal
 Belford Hendricks – arranger, conductor

References

1962 albums
Nat King Cole albums
Capitol Records albums
Albums conducted by Belford Hendricks
Albums arranged by Belford Hendricks